Fort Hill Community School was a coeducational secondary school located in Winklebury, Basingstoke, Hampshire, England.

Location
The school was built within the ramparts of an Iron Age hill fort, Winklebury Ring. Around the school perimeter some of the old ditch site still remains. It is thought that the Celts once established a farming society around this fort. 

The school was closed in 2018 and demolition of the site commenced in January 2019.

References

External links
http://www.forthillcommunityschool.org/
http://www.chjs.net
http://www.winkleburyfederation.com/
http://www.chiltern-pri.hants.sch.uk/

Defunct schools in Hampshire
Schools in Basingstoke
1977 establishments in England
Educational institutions established in 1977
Educational institutions disestablished in 2018
2018 disestablishments in England